The Ethiopian Athletics Championships is an annual track and field competition which serves as the national championship for Ethiopia. It is organised by the Ethiopian Athletics Federation, Ethiopia's national governing body for the sport of athletics. The winner of each event at the championships is declared the national champion for that year.

Men

100 metres
1992: Tesfaye Jenbere
1993: Tesfaye Jenbere
1994: Tesfaye Jenbere
1995: Tesfaye Jenbere
1996: Negussie Getchamo
1997: Negussie Getchamo
1998: Negussie Getchamo
1999: ?
2000: Negussie Getchamo
2001: Negussie Getchamo
2002: ?
2003: Tadele Alemu
2004: Wetere Gelelcha
2005: Wetere Gelelcha

200 metres
1992: Getahun Workesa
1993: Getachew Legesse
1994: Tesfaye Jenbere
1995: Getachew Legesse
1996: Negussie Getchamo
1997: Negussie Getchamo
1998: Negussie Getchamo
1999: ?
2000: Negussie Getchamo
2001: Shiferaw Shibiru
2002: ?
2003: Negussie Getchamo
2004: Alemayehu Adebo
2005: Wetere Gelelcha
2006: Wetere Gelelcha

400 metres
1992: Bekele Ergego
1993: Bekele Ergego
1994: Bedasa Tafa
1995: Bedasa Tafa
1996: Bedasa Tafa
1997: Alemayehu Adis
1998: Alemayehu Adebo
1999: ?
2000: Alemayehu Adebo
2001: ?
2002: ?
2003: Alemayehu Adebo
2004: Alemayehu Adebo
2005: Habtamu Abeje
2006: Habtamu Abeje

800 metres
1992: Bekele Banbere
1993: Bekele Banbere
1994: Bekele Banbere
1995: Bekele Banbere
1996: Bekele Ergego
1997: Mechal Gebreab
1998: Mechal Gebreab
1999: ?
2000: Berhanu Alemu
2001: Daniel Zegeye
2002: ?
2003: Berhanu Alemu
2004: Samuel Dadi
2005: Abiyot Abebe
2006: Kumsa Adugna

1500 metres
1992: Tamrat Dadi
1993: Hailu Zewode
1994: Hailu Zewode
1995: Abreham Tsige
1996: Mizan Mehari
1997: Mengesha Feyisa
1998: Haile Gebrselassie
1999: ?
2000: Hailu Mekonnen
2001: Daniel Zegeye
2002: ?
2003: Berhanu Alemu
2004: Seifu Nebse
2005: Race declared void
2006: Kumsa Adugna

5000 metres
1992: Fita Bayisa
1993: Haile Gebrselassie
1994: Habte Jifar
1995: Lemi Erpassa
1996: Girma Tolla
1997: Hailu Mekonnen
1998: Hailu Mekonnen
1999: ?
2000: Dagne Alemu
2001: Abiyot Abate
2002: ?
2003: Sileshi Sihine
2004: Kenenisa Bekele
2005: Gebregziabher Gebremariam
2006: Markos Geneti

10,000 metres
1992: Addis Abebe
1993: Fita Bayisa
1994: Chala Kelele
1995: Habte Jifar
1996: Girma Tolla
1997: Assefa Mezgebu
1998: Assefa Mezgebu
1999: ?
2000: Assefa Mezgebu
2001: Assefa Mezgebu
2002: ?
2003: Sileshi Sihine
2004: Sileshi Sihine
2005: Gebregziabher Gebremariam
2006: Ibrahim Jeilan

Half marathon
1993: Gebremichael Kidane
1994: ?
1995: ?
1996: ?
1997: ?
1998: Alene Emere
1999: ?
2000: ?
2001: ?
2002: ?
2003: Dereje Adere
2004: ?
2005: Solomon Tsige

3000 metres steeplechase
1992: Bizuneh Yai Tura
1993: Simretu Alemayehu
1994: Ayele Mezgebu
1995: Lemma Alemayehu
1996: Geremew Haile
1997: Simretu Alemayehu
1998: Simretu Alemayehu
1999: ?
2000: Lemma Alemayehu
2001: Maru Daba
2002: ?
2003: Bulti Bekele
2004: Tewodros Shiferaw
2005: Roba Gari
2006: Eskyas Sisay

110 metres hurdles
1992: Tesfaye Aschalew
1993: Abusha Demisse
1994: Tesfaye Aschalew
1995: Zelalem Aklilu
1996: Zelalem Aklilu
1997: Zelalem Aklilu
1998: Defaru Asfaw
1999: ?
2000: Zelalem Aklilu
2001: ?
2002: ?
2003: Ubang Abaya
2004: Ubang Abaya
2005: Ubang Abaya

400 metres hurdles
1992: Tesfaye Aschalew
1993: Tesfaye Aschalew
1994: Abusha Demisse
1995: Tesfaye Aschalew
1996: Defaru Asfaw
1997: Mesfin Tefera
1998: Defaru Asfaw
1999: ?
2000: Mesfin Tefera
2001: ?
2002: ?
2003: Ubang Abaya
2004: Ubang Abaya
2005: Ubang Abaya

High jump
1992: Zeleke Aredo
1993: Getu Keberie
1994: Rahmeto Shahibo
1995: Rahmeto Shahibo
1996: Teshome Kemiso
1997: Teshome Kemiso
1998: Teshome Kemiso
1999: ?
2000: Teshome Kemiso
2001: ?
2002: ?
2003: Jemal Ahmed
2004: Ujulo Ubang
2005: Ujulo Ubang

Pole vault
1994: Feyesa Atewa
1995: Feyisa Otadi
1996: Berhanu Semanu
1997: Feyisa Etao
1998: Tadesse Yirga
1999: ?
2000: Yared Assefa
2001: ?
2002: ?
2003: Not held
2004: Seatu Tilahun Berhe
2005: Seatu Tilahun Berhe
2006: Abula Ubang

Long jump
1992: Gashawbeza Lemma
1993: Gashawbeza Lemma
1994: Gashawbeza Lemma
1995: Gashawbeza Lemma
1996: Zelalem Aklilu
1997: Zelalem Aklilu
1998: Negussie Getchamo
1999: ?
2000: Negussie Getchamo
2001: Negussie Getchamo
2002: ?
2003: Gezenew Meteku
2004: Negussie Getchamo
2005: Girmay Gebretsadik

Triple jump
1992: Gashawbeza Lemma
1993: Gashawbeza Lemma
1994: Gashawbeza Lemma
1995: Gashawbeza Lemma
1996: Jasahun Tassema
1997: Berhanu Fekede
1998: Berhanu Fekede
1999: ?
2000: Berhanu Fekede
2001: ?
2002: ?
2003: Gezenew Meteku
2004: ?
2005: Berhanu Fekede
2006: Galwak Garkot

Shot put
1992: Tsegaye Woldesenbet
1993: Geresu Zaddo
1994: Tsegaye Woldesenbet
1995: Tsegaye Woldesenbet
1996: Tsegaye Woldesenbet
1997: Tsegaye Woldesenbet
1998: Tsegaye Woldesenbet
1999: ?
2000: Tsegaye Woldesenbet
2001: Tsegaye Woldesenbet
2002: ?
2003: Tsegaye Woldesenbet
2004: Sisay Mekonnen
2005: Tsegaye Woldesenbet
2006: Sisay Mekonnen

Discus throw
1992: Desta Wajkira
1993: Demisse Balcha
1994: Desta Wajkira
1995: Desta Wajkira
1996: Desta Wajkira
1997: Desta Wajkira
1998: Desta Wajkira
1999: ?
2000: Tsegaye Woldesenbet
2001: ?
2002: ?
2003: Tsegaye Woldesenbet
2004: Tsegaye Woldesenbet
2005: Tsegaye Woldesenbet
2006: Mohamed Sale

Hammer throw
1993: Desta Wajkira
1994: Desta Wajkira
1995: Desta Wajkira
1996: Desta Wajkira
1997: Desta Wajkira
1998: Diko Kebede
1999: ?
2000: Diko Kebede
2001: ?
2002: ?
2003: Sisay Mekonnen
2004: Sisay Mekonnen
2005: Sisay Mekonnen
2006: Sisay Mekonnen

Javelin throw
1992: Bekele Tola
1993: Bekele Tola
1994: Bekele Tola
1995: Geremew Jibat
1996: Diro Tola
1997: Diro Tola
1998: Diro Tola
1999: ?
2000: Diro Tola
2001: ?
2002: ?
2003: Abdissa Tadesse
2004: Diro Tola
2005: Abdissa Tadesse

10,000 metres track walk
1993: Getachew Demisse
1994: Getachew Demisse
1995: Getachew Demisse

20 kilometres walk
1996: Getachew Demisse
1997: Getachew Demisse
1998: Getachew Demisse
1999: ?
2000: ?
2001: ?
2002: ?
2003: Ashenafi Mercha
2004: Ashenafi Mercha
2005: Ashenafi Mercha
2006: Cherenet Makore

Women

100 metres
1992: Abaynesh Arega
1993: Alemitu Dissasa
1994: Alemitu Dissasa
1995: Rahel Kebere
1996: Genet Badi
1997: Netsanet Getu
1998: Netsanet Getu
1999: Netsanet Getu
2000: Kassu Chiquala
2001: ?
2002: ?
2003: Leaynet Alemu
2004: Ayneaddis Tessema
2005: Atekelt Wubshet

200 metres
1992: Abaynesh Arega
1993: Abaynesh Arega
1994: Genet Badi
1995: Woynshet Eka
1996: Genet Badi
1997: Netsanet Getu
1998: Netsanet Getu
1999: Netsanet Getu
2000: Netsanet Getu
2001: ?
2002: ?
2003: Leaynet Alemu
2004: Netsanet Getu
2005: Atekelt Wubshet
2006: Atekelt Wubshet

400 metres
1992: Senait Haile
1993: Abaynesh Arega
1994: Abaynesh Arega
1995: Abaynesh Arega
1996: Abaynesh Arega
1997: Woynshet Eka
1998: Fekerte Dagne
1999: Senait Kedir
2000: Netsanet Getu
2001: ?
2002: ?
2003: Netsanet Getu
2004: Netsanet Getu
2005: Lemdsa Kumsa
2006: Abebe Megersa

800 metres
1992: Zewde Hailemariam
1993: Zewde Hailemariam
1994: Kutre Dulecha
1995: Shura Hutesa
1996: Sentayehu Fikre
1997: Kutre Dulecha
1998: Kutre Dulecha
1999: Kutre Dulecha
2000: Kutre Dulecha
2001: Genet Gebregiorgis
2002: ?
2003: Meskerem Legesse
2004: Meskerem Legesse
2005: Mestawat Tadesse
2006: Mestawat Tadesse

1500 metres
1992: Ejigayehu Worku
1993: Getenesh Urge
1994: Kutre Dulecha
1995: Sentayehu Fikre
1996: Sentayehu Fikre
1997: Kutre Dulecha
1998: Kutre Dulecha
1999: Kutre Dulecha
2000: Kutre Dulecha
2001: Genet Gebregiorgis
2002: ?
2003: Meskerem Legesse
2004: Gelete Burka
2005: Gelete Burka
2006: Birhane Hirpassa

3000 metres
1992: Emebet Shiferaw
1993: Berhane Adere
1994: Derartu Tulu
1995: Not held
1996: Not held
1997: Not held
1998: Not held
1999: Not held
2000: Not held
2001: Not held
2002: ?
2003: Meseret Defar
2004: Meseret Defar
2005: Belaynesh Zemedkun
2006: Koren Jelela

5000 metres
1995: Ayelech Worku
1996: Luchia Yishak
1997: Merima Denboba
1998: Getenesh Urge
1999: Ayelech Worku
2000: Gete Wami
2001: Ayelech Worku
2002: ?
2003: Tirunesh Dibaba
2004: Meselech Melkamu
2005: Gelete Burka
2006: Meseret Defar

10,000 metres
1992: Derartu Tulu
1993: Berhane Adere
1994: Merima Denboba
1995: Merima Denboba
1996: Fatuma Roba
1997: Merima Denboba
1998: Merima Denboba
1999: Gete Wami
2000: Merima Denboba
2001: Merima Denboba
2002: ?
2003: Werknesh Kidane
2004: Derartu Tulu
2005: Werknesh Kidane
2006: Bezunesh Bekele

Half marathon
1998: Asha Gigi
1999: ?
2000: ?
2001: ?
2002: ?
2003: Teyba Erkesso
2004: ?
2005: Merima Hashim

3000 metres steeplechase
2006: Mekdes Bekele

100 metres hurdles
1993: Wali Engida
1994: Wali Engida
1995: Wali Engida
1996: Wali Engida
1997: Wali Engida
1998: Senait Kedir
1999: ?
2000: Astegedech Bekele
2001: ?
2002: ?
2003: Netsanet Bekele
2004: Netsanet Bekele
2005: Netsanet Bekele
2006: Terhas Haileselassie

400 metres hurdles
1993: Ethiopia Terefe
1994: Aster Geleta
1995: Aster Geleta
1996: Fekerte Dagne
1997: Fekerte Dagne
1998: Fekerte Dagne
1999: ?
2000: Almaz Finfe
2001: ?
2002: ?
2003: Fekerte Dagne
2004: Tadelech Eruero
2005: Mendaye Lemma

High jump
1992: Hiwot Sisay
1993: Hiwot Sisay
1994: Hiwot Sisay
1995: Hiwot Sisay
1996: Aynalem Tilahun
1997: Hiwot Sisay
1998: Senait Kedir
1999: ?
2000: Aynalem Tilahun
2001: ?
2002: ?
2003: Haymanot Bekele
2004: Haregewoin Mengitsu
2005: Mekdes Bekele
2006: Haymanot Bekele

Long jump
1992: Hiwot Sisay
1993: Hiwot Sisay
1994: Hiwot Sisay
1995: Tadelech Eruero
1996: Wali Engida
1997: Hiwot Sisay
1998: Hiwot Sisay
1999: ?
2000: Netsanet Getu
2001: ?
2002: ?
2003: Emebet Tilahun
2004: Tadelech Eruero
2005: Emebet Tilahun
2006: Emebet Tilahun

Triple jump
1997: Tadelech Eruero
1998: Tadelech Eruero
1999: ?
2000: Emebet Tilahun
2001: ?
2002: ?
2003: Tadelech Eruero
2004: ?
2005: Emebet Tilahun
2006: Emebet Tilahun

Shot put
1992: Debritu Tilahun
1993: Debritu Tilahun
1994: Debritu Tilahun
1995: Debritu Tilahun
1996: Debritu Tilahun
1997: Debritu Tilahun
1998: Debritu Tilahun
1999: ?
2000: Roman Abera
2001: ?
2002: ?
2003: Roman Abera
2004: Roman Abera
2005: Roman Abera
2006: Roman Abera

Discus throw
1992: Gete Tekle
1993: Welete Hamdie
1994: Zinabua Takele
1995: Zinabua Takele
1996: Debritu Tilahun
1997: Zinabua Takele
1998: Debritu Tilahun
1999: ?
2000: Debritu Tilahun
2001: ?
2002: ?
2003: Meseret Gebretsadik
2004: Meseret Gebretsadik
2005: Mersit Gebregziabher
2006: Zewdenesh Beshah

Javelin throw
1992: Aynalem Tekabe
1993: Aynalem Tekabe
1994: Aberach Geletu
1995: Aynalem Tekabe
1996: Aynalem Tekabe
1997: Aynalem Tekabe
1998: Aynalem Tekabe
1999: ?
2000: Aynalem Tekabe
2001: ?
2002: ?
2003: Aynalem Tekabe
2004: Aynalem Tekabe
2005: Abaynesh Sisay
2006: Abaynesh Sisay

5000 metres walk
1993: Amsale Yakobe
1994: Amsale Yakobe
1995: Amsale Yakobe

10 kilometres walk
The 1997 and 1998 championships were held as track events.
1996: Amsale Yakobe
1997: Gete Koma
1998: Gete Koma
1999: ?
2000: ?
2001: ?
2002: ?
2003: Amsale Yakobe
2004: ?
2005: Hanna Haileselassie
2006: Asnakech Ararso

References

Champions 1992–2006
Ethiopian Championships. GBR Athletics. Retrieved 2021-04-17.

Winners
 
Ethiopian Championships
Athletics